Muzafer-ul-Mulk is a Pakistani politician who had been a member of the National Assembly of Pakistan from 2008 to 2013.

Political career
He was elected to the National Assembly of Pakistan from Constituency NA-29 (Swat-I) as a candidate of Awami National Party (ANP) in 2008 Pakistani general election. He received 19,860 votes and defeated an independent candidate, Mian Gul Adnan Aurangzeb. He was criticized for his poor performance during his tenure as Member of the National Assembly.

He ran for the seat of the National Assembly from Constituency NA-29 (Swat-I) as a candidate of ANP in 2013 Pakistani general election but was unsuccessful. He received 14,690 voted and lost the seat to Murad Saeed.

References

Pakistani MNAs 2008–2013
Living people
People from Swat District
Year of birth missing (living people)